Shrinking Violet is the sixth studio album by glam metal band L.A. Guns, first released on June 1, 1999, through Perris Records, and is the only L.A. Guns album with singer Jizzy Pearl. The album was reissued, with bonus tracks and new artwork, on May 24, 2010, through Favored Nations. The album was produced by former Guns N' Roses guitarist Gilby Clarke who also provided additional guitars on the track "Dreamtime".

Track listing

Personnel
Jizzy Pearl - lead vocals
Tracii Guns - guitars, theremin, arrangements
Johnny Crypt - bass guitar, additional vocals, engineer
Steve Riley - drums

Additional personnel
Gilby Clarke - additional guitar on "Dreamtime", producer, engineer
Teddy Andreadis - piano, synth and organ on "Dreamtime" and "Barbed Wire"

References

1999 albums
L.A. Guns albums
Albums produced by Gilby Clarke